Putumayo may refer to: 
 Putumayo Department, Colombia
 Putumayo Province, Loreto Region, Peru
 Putumayo District, Putumayo Province, Loreto Region, Peru
 Putumayo Canton, Ecuador
 Putumayo River or Içá River, a river in South America
 Putumayo World Music, a record label
 Putumayo, a fictional store in the Seinfeld episode "The Millennium"

See also
 Potemayo, Japanese manga and anime series